Piero Focaccia (born 16 October 1944) is an Italian pop singer and film actor.

Career
Born in Cervia, Ravenna, a former lifeguard, Focaccia began his career in 1962, with the single Il pappagallo. He got his main success one year later with the song Stessa spiaggia stesso mare which won the Disco per l'estate competition and reached the third place at the Italian hit parade. After a less successful period, in 1970 his song Permette signora peaked number nine at the hit parade.
 
Focaccia entered the Sanremo Music Festival competition three times between 1964 and 1974.

He was also actor in two comedy films, Mariano Laurenti's La bella Antonia, prima Monica e poi Dimonia and Luigi Comencini's Le bambole.

References

External links

 
 
 

1944 births
People from the Province of Ravenna
Italian pop singers
Living people
Italian male film actors